Itaura is a village in Jalaun district in the Indian state of Uttar Pradesh. 
This is a twin village and it includes Akbarpur (Guru ka itora) and Itora (Purana Itora).

Village has historical value because of its location, which is between Kanpur, Jhansi, Orai, Mahoba and Kalpi.

Climate
This place has a composite climate with very hot during summers and very cold during winters. Relative humidity remains about 40-50%.

Demographics
 India census, Itaura had a population of 19,455. Males constitute 54% of the population and females 46%. Etaura has an average literacy rate of 70%, higher than the national average of 65.38%. Male literacy is 76%, and female literacy is 62%. In Itaura, 12% of the population is under 6 years of age.

Location
Itaura is located midway between the cities of Kanpur and Jhansi and lies on National Highway (NH-25) which is soon going to be a part of East-West corridor of the NHAI Project. It is approximate 25 km from Orai.

Connectivity
Itaura is well connected by road. Nearest railway station is Ata, which is 10 km from Itaura.
and other nearest railway station is kalpi which is 15 km from akbarpur itaura.

Temple 
 Ropan Guru Baba mandir
 Barimata mandir
 Kalimata mandir
 Baba mahraj mandir in ahirwa
 Bajrag vali mandir man rod yadav nagar
 Ropan guru mandir mila≤ nov≥ 2013 
 Lala Hardaul temple near vivekanand chauraha in akbarpur
 Shri Radha Krishna temple (Main Market)

Education

Schools & institutions 
 Global institution (computer coaching center)
 Kanya Pathshala
 Primary Schools (Two)
 Saraswati shishu mandir
 Pharmacy College  Itaura
 Dr Ambedkar Junior High School, Itaura 
 Inter college Itaura (Government of India)
 S. K. D memorial akedmy
 D. P. Cumpus coaching center
 Gyandeep public school
 Saraswati Gyan mandir
 Golden life public school
 Sarswati shiksha mandir 
 Chandra shekhar aajad higher sec. School
 Karmyog mahavidhyalaya

References

External links
 Indra Gandhi Stadium

Cities and towns in Jalaun district